Callitriche brutia, the pedunculate water-starwort, is a submerged/floating-leaved aquatic plant in the family Plantaginaceae (though sometimes placed in its own family – Callitrichaceae). It is found in aquatic environments in Europe.

Description
Callitriche brutia is a long plant that can be seen with many rounded leaves across its stem. It has a bundle of leaves at the top, in a flower-like shape. It can often be seen growing in large amounts in a single area. It often grows directly in water, or very damp areas.

Distribution and habitat
The habitats ranges from ephemeral pools, lakes and canals to fast-flowing upland rivers Europe-wide.

References

brutia
Freshwater plants
Plants described in 1787
Flora of Europe